Calathus laureticola is a species of ground beetle from the Platyninae subfamily that is endemic to the Canary Islands.

References

laureticola
Beetles described in 1865
Endemic beetles of the Canary Islands